Ernesto Pérez Acosta (born 14 June 1946) is a Mexican professional golfer. He is considered one of Mexico's all-time top male professional golfers, sharing this merit with PGA Tour winners Victor Regalado, Abraham Ancer and Carlos Ortiz, Champions Tour winner Esteban Toledo, Mexico's all-time best amateur golfer Juan Antonio Estrada and international tour player Rafael Alarcón.

Early life 
Pérez Acosta was born and raised in the Agua Caliente neighborhood of Tijuana, Mexico. He grew up in a family of a well-known and respected dynasty of pro golfers in Mexico, along brothers Fidel, David, Eduardo, Luis and Carlos. He had his beginnings in the golfing arena as a caddie at the Tijuana Country Club, where he came to be a long-time club and touring professional.

Amateur career 
As an amateur, Pérez Acosta represented Mexico at the 1968 Eisenhower Trophy, in Melbourne, Australia, and the Copa de la Hispanidad in Manila, Philippines, where his team won the international championship.

Professional career 
Pérez Acosta turned professional in 1970 and won two Mexican Open titles, being the first Mexican winner and still remains the only Mexican with multiple titles. In his native country, he collected over 75 titles over the span of four decades, making him one of Mexico's winningest professional golfers in the country's history.

He represented Mexico five times in the World Cup, winning the individual title in 1976 at Mission Hills Country Club in Rancho Mirage, California, United States, three strokes ahead of six players, including the 1976 U.S. Open champion Jerry Pate, PGA Championship winner Dave Stockton, and rising stars Greg Norman and Seve Ballesteros. The Mexico team of Pérez Acosta and Margarito Martinez finished tied 5th. 

After his 1976 individual World Cup victory, Perez Acosta signed a management deal with famed sports agent Mark McCormack. This accomplishment earned him multiple invitations to international and official PGA Tour events, such as the 1977 World Match Play at Wentworth Club, England, The 1977 King Hassan World Open in Rabat, Morocco, the 1977 Memorial Tournament and the NEC World Series of Golf, at Firestone Country Club in Akron, Ohio, a 20-man event with the biggest first prize on the 1977 PGA Tour.

Pérez Acosta has represented Mexico in 54 countries in different professional circuits such as the PGA, Champions, European, of which he is one of the founding members, Canadian, South American and Asian Tours.

Private life, awards 
After retiring from international competition, Pérez Acosta served as Director of Golf at several country clubs in Mexico.

Pérez Acosta and his older brother David also served as presidents of the Mexican section of the PGA. Ernesto was later inducted into Tijuana's Sports Hall of Fame in 2008.

Pérez Acosta is now fully retired from competition. He spends his time playing, teaching and coaching golf at his home club, the Tijuana Country Club, formerly known as the Agua Caliente Golf Club.

Second generation Pérez Acosta family golf professionals include his son Ernesto Jr, a professional golf resort operator and hotelier, currently staffed at the Brentwood Country Club in Los Angeles, nephew Luis Carlos, golf coach-instructor in Tijuana and nephew Jorge Perez Leon, Head Golf Professional at the Guadalajara Country Club, home club of Hall of Famer and LPGA Tour Star golfer Lorena Ochoa and PGA Tour player Carlos Ortiz.

Professional wins
This list is incomplete.
1970 Mexican Open
1971 Utah Open
1973 Tijuana Open
1974 Mexican PGA Championship, Guadalajara International Open
1975 Mexican Masters, Mexican Tournament of Champions, Guadalajara International Open
1976 Mexican Open, Mexican Masters, Mexican Tournament of Champions, Mexican PGA Championship, International Trophy (World Cup individual winner), Campestre de Coatzacoalcos Pro-Am (Mexico)
1978 Rolex World Mixed Championships (Tokyo, Japan) (with Nancy Lopez)
1981 Campestre de Coatzacoalcos Pro-Am (Mexico)
1982 New Mexico Open
2000 Mexican Senior Championship

Team appearances
Amateur
America's Cup: 1967
Copa de la Hispanidad (representing Mexico): 1968 (winners)
Eisenhower Trophy (representing Mexico): 1968

Professional
World Cup (representing Mexico): 1975, 1976 (individual winner), 1978, 1980, 1987
Alfred Dunhill Cup (representing Mexico): 1987

References

External links

Mexican male golfers
Sportspeople from Tijuana
1946 births
Living people
20th-century Mexican people